The Indian Premier League (IPL) is a Twenty20 cricket competition based in India. The tournament honours players with several awards at the end of each season. They are Orange Cap, Purple Cap, Maximum Sixes Award, Most Valuable Player and Emerging Player of the Year Etc.

Orange Cap 
The Orange Cap, currently known as the Aramco Orange Cap for sponsorship reasons, is presented to the leading run scorer in the Indian Premier League (IPL). It was introduced on 25 April 2008, a week after the start of the inaugural season of the IPL. The batsman with most runs in the tournament during the course of the season would wear the Orange Cap while fielding, with the overall leading run-scorer at the conclusion of the tournament winning the actual Orange Cap award on the day of the season's final. Brendon McCullum became the first player to wear the Orange Cap, and Shaun Marsh became the first winner of the award. So far David Warner has won the cap thrice followed by Chris Gayle who has achieved the feat twice. Virat Kohli scored the most runs (973) in a single edition of the tournament in the 2016 Indian Premier League.

The then IPL chairman and commissioner Lalit Modi said of the initiative, "Cricket is often remembered and recorded as statistics and not by material distinctions. The DLF Indian Premier League will create a distinction for the best performing batsman, which will be cherished and valued by each player through this initiative. The purpose of this initiative is to be innovative, create another unique piece of history that sets the DLF Indian Premier League apart from the crowd, and to reward outstanding achievements by the players."

 indicates the player captained his team for the season.

Purple Cap 

The Purple Cap, currently known as the Aramco Purple Cap for sponsorship reasons, is presented to the leading wicket-taker in the IPL. After the introduction of Orange Cap on 25 April 2008, the IPL announced the introduction of the Purple Cap on 13 May 2008. The bowler with most wickets in the tournament during the course of the season would wear the Purple Cap while fielding, with the overall leading wicket-taker at the conclusion of the tournament winning the actual Purple Cap award on the day of the season's final. In case of a tie, the bowler with superior economy rate would hold the Purple Cap. So far only Bhuvneshwar Kumar and Dwayne Bravo have won the Purple Cap twice. Dwayne Bravo and Harshal Patel scalped 32 wickets in the 2013 Indian Premier League and 2021 Indian Premier League respectively, the most for any bowlers in a single edition of the tournament but Dwayne Bravo remains ahead of Harshal Patel because of better economy rate of the two as per the IPL rules.

The then IPL chairman and commissioner Lalit Modi said of the initiative, "We have seen over the course of the inaugural season of the League so far that bowlers have just as important a role to play in winning T20 matches as batsmen do."

Maximum Sixes Award 
The Maximum Sixes Award, currently known as Unacademy Let's Crack It Sixes Award for sponsorship reasons, is presented to the batsman who hits the most sixes in a season of the IPL.

In 2017, Maxwell and David Warner were both tied with 26 sixes, but Maxwell won the award due to a higher strike-rate in the tournament.

Most Valuable Player
The award was called the Man of the Tournament until the 2012 season. The IPL introduced the Most Valuable Player rating system in 2013, the leader of which would be named the Most Valuable Player at the end of the season. According to the points system, every four hit is equal to 2.5 points. Every six hit and wicket taken is equal to 3.5 points each. Every dot ball bowled gets 1 point. Every catch taken and stumping done are equal to 2.5 points each. The award is currently known as Upstox Most Valuable Player due to sponsorship reasons.

 Winners

Player of the match (Final)

Emerging Player of the Year 
The award was presented for the "best Under-19 player" in 2008 and the "best Under-23 player" in 2009 and 2010, being called "Under-23 Success of the Tournament". In the 2011 and 2012 seasons, the award was known as "Rising Star of the Year", while, in 2013, it was called "Best Young Player of the Season". Since 2014, the award has been called the Emerging Player of the Year. Only players who have played fewer than five Tests, twenty One Day Internationals (ODI), and twenty five IPL matches at the start of the season are eligible for the award and can only win the award once.

So far, the only foreign player to win the award is the Bangladeshi pacer Mustafizur Rahman, in 2016 season.

Super Striker of the Season 
This award is given to the batsmen with the highest strike rate of the season with minimum cutoff of 300 runs scored in the season.

Best Catch of the Season

Fair Play Award 

The Fair Play Award is given after each season to the team with the best record of fair play. The winner is decided on the basis of the points the umpires give to the teams. After each match, the two on-field umpires, and the third umpire, scores the performance of both the teams. A team can be awarded a total of ten points per match, out of which four points are given on the basis of how the team has adhered to the "spirit of the game" in the opinion of the umpires. The other three criteria are based on the respect towards to the opposition, the laws of cricket and the umpires. Each of these three criteria represents 2 points. If a team has got two points in the criterion, its performance is considered as "good", whereas getting one or zero points indicates that its performance is "average" or "bad" respectively.

See also 
List of Indian Premier League centuries
List of Indian Premier League five-wicket hauls
List of Indian Premier League records and statistics

References 

Awards
Cricket awards and rankings